Surface energy transfer (SET) is a dipole-surface energy transfer process involving a metallic surface and a molecular dipole.

Formula
The SET rate follows the inverse of the fourth power of the distance

where 
 is the donor emission lifetime;
 is the distance between donor-acceptor;
 is the distance at which SET efficiency decreases to 50% (i.e., equal probability of energy transfer and spontaneous emission).

Efficiency
The energy transfer efficiency also follows a similar form

Due to the fourth power dependence SET can cover a distance more than 15 nm, which is almost twice the efficiency of FRET. Theoretically predicted in 1978 by Chance et al. it was proved experimentally in 2000s by different workers.

Applications
The efficiency of SET as nanoruler has been used in live cells.

Gold nano particles are frequently used in these studies as the nanoparticle surface.

See also
Dexter electron transfer
Förster resonance energy transfer

References

Energy transfer
Fluorescence